Emmanuel-Marie Blain de Saint-Aubin (30 June 1833 – 9 July 1883) was an educator, songwriter, story-teller, and translator. He was born in Rennes, France and arrived in Canada East probably in 1859.

References 

 
 TheMusicSack -  Emmanuel-Marie Blain de Saint-Aubin
 La mère canadienne

1833 births
1883 deaths
Canadian educators
Canadian songwriters
Canadian storytellers
French emigrants to pre-Confederation Quebec
19th-century storytellers